Sarab-e Humyan (also Romanized as Sarāb-e Hūmīān; also known as Shahrak Sarāb-e Hūmīān) is a village in Kuhdasht-e Shomali Rural District, in the Central District of Kuhdasht County, Lorestan Province, Iran. At the 2006 census, its population was 177, in 30 families.

References 

Towns and villages in Kuhdasht County